Agusalu Nature Reserve is a nature reserve situated in eastern Estonia, in Ida-Viru County.

The nature reserve encompasses a portion of a large area of wetland, and the landscape is dominated by bogs; however it is also the location of the only system of continental sand dunes in Estonia, overgrown with rare old-growth forest. The area has traditionally been difficult to access and therefore the traces of human influence are very limited. It even served as a refuge for local people during times of war. Oil shale mining in the vicinity, as well as intensified forestry, are today the major threats to the area's unique environment.

The area is home to a number of rare or protected species. From the fauna, gray wolf and Eurasian lynx can  be mentioned, as well as several birds - it is the most important nesting area in Estonia for the common greenshank and home to both white-tailed eagle and golden eagle. Plant species include unusual orchids.

Today, the area has been equipped with a bicycle trail and other facilities for visitors.

See also
 Protected areas of Estonia
 List of protected areas of Estonia
 List of Ramsar sites in Estonia

References

Nature reserves in Estonia
Alutaguse Parish
Forests of Estonia
Ramsar sites in Estonia
Geography of Ida-Viru County
Tourist attractions in Ida-Viru County